XHXU-FM is a radio station on 94.7 FM in Frontera, Coahuila. It is known as La Poderosa.

History
XEXU-AM 1480 received its concession on December 6, 1972. It was owned by Jesús F. Elizondo Valdéz and was a 1,000-watt daytimer.

References

Radio stations in Coahuila